is a railway station located in the city of Sagae, Yamagata Prefecture, Japan, operated by the East Japan Railway Company (JR East).

Lines
Minami-Sagae Station is served by the Aterazawa Line, and is located 13.5 rail kilometers from the terminus of the line at Kita-Yamagata Station.

Station layout
The station has one side platform serving a single bi-directional track. The station is unattended.

History
Minami-Sagae Station began operation on 25 December 1951  With the privatization of the JNR on April 1, 1987, the station came under the control of the East Japan Railway Company.

Surrounding area
 Mogami River
Sagae Shima Post Office

See also
List of Railway Stations in Japan

References

External links 

 Minami-Sagae Station (JR East) 

Railway stations in Yamagata Prefecture
Aterazawa Line
Railway stations in Japan opened in 1951
Sagae, Yamagata